The enzyme phenylalanine decarboxylase catalyzes the chemical reaction

L-phenylalanine  phenethylamine + CO2

This enzyme belongs to the family of lyases, specifically the carboxy-lyases, which cleave carbon-carbon bonds.  The systematic name of this enzyme class is L-phenylalanine carboxy-lyase (phenylethylamine-forming). Other names in common use include L-phenylalanine decarboxylase, aromatic L-amino acid decarboxylase, and L-phenylalanine carboxy-lyase. This enzyme participates in phenylalanine metabolism.  It employs one cofactor, pyridoxal phosphate.

References

 
 

EC 4.1.1
Pyridoxal phosphate enzymes
Enzymes of unknown structure